Kirsten Hansteen (5 January 1903 – 17 November 1974) was a Norwegian  editor and librarian. She was appointed Minister of Social Affairs with Gerhardsen's First Cabinet in 1945 and was the first female member of cabinet in Norway.

Biography
She was born at Lyngen in  Troms, Norway.
Her parents were Ole Christian Strøm Moe (1866–1907) and Gerda Sophie Landmark (1871–1934).  Her father died when she was only four years old, and her mother moved her five children to Kristiania (now Oslo). She graduated artium in 1921 and later studied  German and Norwegian at the University of Oslo.

In 1930, she married attorney Viggo Hansteen (1900-1941). Her husband was executed in 1941 during the Occupation of Norway by Nazi Germany. She edited the underground resistance and feminist paper Kvinnefronten (The Women's front) during the German occupation. 

After the liberation of Norway at the end of World War II, she co-founded the journal Kvinnen og Tiden with Henriette Bie Lorentzen (1911–2001). 
Lorentzen and Hansteen served as joint editors-in-chief of the journal which was in publication from December 1945 until 1955.
Kirsten Hansteen was also a Member of the Norwegian Parliamentary from Akershus as a representative of the Communist Party of Norway from 1945 to 1949.
Between 25 July and 5 November 1945, she served as Consultative Councillor of State in the Ministry of Social Affairs  under Prime Minister Einar Gerhardsen. 
From 1959, Kirsten Hansteen worked at the University of Oslo Library as a librarian  until she retired in 1970. She died during 1974 in Oslo.

References

Other sources
 

20th-century Norwegian women politicians
20th-century Norwegian politicians
20th-century Norwegian women writers
20th-century Norwegian writers
1903 births
1974 deaths
Academic librarians
Communist Party of Norway politicians
Norwegian magazine editors
Norwegian women editors
Norwegian magazine founders
Norwegian newspaper editors
Norwegian socialist feminists
Women government ministers of Norway
Women members of the Storting
Women newspaper editors